Best is the first Japanese compilation album and sixth overall album release by Mika Nakashima. It contains 14 songs. Two new re-recordings were made: one of her first single, 'Stars,' and the other of 'Amazing Grace (05),' the latter of which was included in a Suntory commercial for Freixnet Champagne and made as a radio-only single to promote the album in Japan.

A music video compilation, also called 'BEST,' was released in Japan and Southeast Asia in December 2005. It contains the music videos for all of Mika's first 18 singles – from 'Stars' to 'Glamorous Sky' – and the promotional videos for 'Amazing Grace (05)' and a previously unreleased live recording of the song 'Blood.'

Best debuted at #1 in the Japan Oricon 200 Album Chart when it was released, selling 480,097 copies in its first week – bettering the first-week sales of her first album, True. It was the #5 album of 2006.

Since its release, BEST has sold 1,204,996 copies. Therefore, BEST is the second best-selling album in Mika's career only to Love, outselling True by over 30,000 copies.

Track listing

Charts and sales

Oricon sales charts (Japan)

References

2005 greatest hits albums
Mika Nakashima albums